Juan 'Juantxo' Elía Vallejo (born 24 January 1979) is a Spanish former professional footballer who played as a goalkeeper.

Club career
Born in Pamplona, Navarre, Elía spent the bulk of his professional career with hometown's CA Osasuna, save a loan at modest CD Ourense. During the 2004–05 campaign he played a career-high 22 La Liga games, but served mostly as a backup during his spell with his main club, 15 years including his formative ones.

In August 2008, Elía joined Real Murcia, recently relegated to the second division. He was first choice in his debut season but the team only finished in mid-table, being relegated in the following with him appearing in 24 matches.

Elía retired from football in September 2010 at the age of 31, due to persistent back problems.

International career
Elía represented Navarre in two matches.

References

External links

1979 births
Living people
Footballers from Pamplona
Spanish footballers
Association football goalkeepers
La Liga players
Segunda División players
Segunda División B players
CA Osasuna B players
CA Osasuna players
CD Ourense footballers
Real Murcia players
Spain youth international footballers